Julius Caesar is a block wargame designed in 2000 by Justin Thompson and Grant Dalgliesh and produced by Columbia Games.

Description
Julius Caesar is a card driven block wargame based on the Roman Civil War. Players take control of the legions of Julius Caesar or Pompey and fight to determine the future of Rome. Marc Antony, Cleopatra, Octavian, and Brutus also play key roles in the game.

Publication History
The game was released by Columbia Games in 2010.

Reception
BoardGameGeek has Julius Caesar noted as #35 on its best wargames of all time.

Julius Caesar is rated with a 7.8 on BoardGameGeek.

References

External links
 Julius Caesar official website

Board games about history
Board wargames set in Ancient history
Depictions of Julius Caesar in games
Wargames introduced in the 2000s